The 2017 Edmonton municipal election  was held Monday, October 16, 2017, to elect a mayor and 12 councillors to the city council, the nine trustees to Edmonton Public Schools, and the seven trustees to the Edmonton Catholic Schools. One incumbent public school trustee had no challenger so was elected by acclamation; for the other eight balloting was conducted.

They were all elected to four year terms. All contests were conducted according to the First past the post (FPTP) system. Although FPTP elects the candidate that receives the most votes, it does not always produce a winner that has received over 50% of the votes. The winner in seven of the 12 city councillor contests was elected with less than a majority of the votes cast.

Since 2013, provincial legislation has required every municipality to hold quadrennial elections. The voter turnout was 31.5% with 194,826 ballots cast out of the 618,564 estimate eligible voters.

Candidates
Bold indicates elected, italics indicates incumbent.

Mayor

Taz Bouchier Native activist - finished eleventh in the 2013 Ward 6 race
Mike Butler - finished thirteenth in the 2016 Ward 12 by-election race
Ron Cousineau - a retired partner of the Oil City Energy Services
Carla Frost - finished fifth in the 2010 Ward 6 race
Don Iveson - incumbent
Don Koziak - finished second in the 2007 Mayor race
Bob Ligertwood - finished seventh in the 2010 Mayor race
Henry Mak - finished seventh in the 2007 Ward 3 race
Fahad Mughal - former City of Edmonton employee
Gordon Nikolic - business owner
Steven Charles Shewchuk - business owner
Neil Stephens - businessman
Justin Thomas - EPS officer

Ward 1

Randy Allen - 
Reuben Avellana - game designer
Andrew Knack - incumbent
Dave Olivier - businessman

Ward 2

Bev Esslinger - incumbent
Ali Haymour - Alberta Sheriff
Shelly Tupper - finished third in the 2010 Ward 2 race

Ward 3

Jon Dziadyk - urban planner
Dave Loken - incumbent
John Oplanich - finished third in the 2010 Ward 3 race
Karen Principe - dental hygienist
Sarmad Rasheed - business owner

Ward 4

Felix Amenaghawon - engineer
Rocco Caterina - son of Tony Caterina
Justin Draper - activist and policy analyst
Beatrice Kerubo Ghettuba - chartered accountant
Sam Hachem - finished second in the 2013 Ward 4 race
Hassan Haymour - engineer
Wade Izzard - Kelly Services employee
Emerson Mayers - nurse
Martin Narsing - former Royal Canadian Navy officer
Aaron Paquette - artist and author
Alison Poste - Government of Alberta employee
Tricia Velthuizen - political staffer

Ward 5

Philip Michael Asher - former councillor in Fort Nelson
Nafisa Bowen - development officer of Stollery Children's Hospital
Sarah Hamilton - business owner
Miranda Jimmy - program manager
Brian Kendrick - finished third in the 2010 Ward 5 race
Dawn Newton - senior manager of Telus
Svetlana Pavlenko - executive manager
James Prentice - Government of Alberta employee
David Xiao - former MLA

Ward 6

Scott McKeen - incumbent
Bill Knight - entrepreneur
Adil Pirbhai - finished seventh in the 1998 Ward 5 race
Tish George Prouse - finished fourth in the 2013 Ward 7 race

Ward 7

Tony Caterina - incumbent
Kris Andreychuk - social worker
Andrzej Gudanowski - finished thirteenth in the 2013 Ward 6 race
Liz John-West - social worker
Matthew Kleywegt - graduation facilitator
Mimi Williams - finished third in both the 2001 Ward 2 race and the 2013 Ward 7 race

Ward 8

Ben Henderson - incumbent
Rob Bernshaw - finished third in the 2013 Ward 3 race
Kirsten Goa - government employee
James Kosowan - Edmonton Public Schools employee
Eli Schrader - entrepreneur
Heather Workman - finished second in the 2013 Ward 8 race

Ward 9

Rob Agostinis - physician
Tim Cartmell - engineer
Mark Hope - entrepreneur
Payman Parseyan - business owner
Sandy Pon - realtor

Ward 10

Vieri Berretti - businessman
Samantha Hees - UofA administrator
Sim Senol - UofA employee
Michael Walters - incumbent
Glenda K. Williams - former reporter

Ward 11

Rob Armin - finished eighth in the 2013 Ward 11 race
Brandy Burdeniuk - co-founder of EccoAmmo
Chris Christianson - Government of Alberta public servant
Mike Nickel - incumbent
Troy Pavlek - software developer
Keren Tang - civil servant

Ward 12

Moe Banga - incumbent
Nigel Logan - NDP MP constituency assistant
Mike Russnak - business manager
Jo-Anne Wright - government employee
Walter Youb - supply chain consultant

Public school trustees

Separate school trustees

References

External links
 City of Edmonton: Edmonton Elections

2017
2017 Alberta municipal elections